"Active class" may refer to:

 , a class of eight fifth-rate frigates operated by the British Royal Navy from 1780 to 1830
Active-class schooner, a class of six schooners operated by the United States Revenue Cutter Service from 1867 to 1874
 , a class of three scout cruisers operated by the British Royal Navy from 1911 to 1920
 , a class of 32 patrol boats operated by the United States Coast Guard from 1927 to 1978